José Ignacio Palma Vicuña (March 9, 1910 – June 27, 1988) was a Chilean engineer and politician.

Studies
He studied at the Liceo Alemán, (German Lyceum) in Santiago and subsequently at the University of Chile, where he graduated as a civil engineer in 1939 with the thesis entitled "Tranque in Santa Cruz".
He was president of the FECH (Federación de Estudiantes de Chile) in the period 1935–1936, and one of the founders of the National Falange on December 8, 1938, a party that would be the seed of the Christian Democrats.

Political Office
He was Minister of Lands and Settlement of President Gabriel González Videla, within his coalition cabinet.
After that he began his parliamentary career, being elected deputy for the constituency of Valdivia, La Unión and Rio Bueno, first in 1953 and then reelected in 1957. In 1961, the Christian Democratic Party supported him as a candidate for senator for the (then) southernmost senatorial district of Chile (the provinces of Valdivia, Osorno, Llanquihue, Chiloé, Aysén & Magallanes), but he failed in this bid. Four years later, in 1965, he ran again, this time in the district of Atacama & Coquimbo and was elected.
He was second vice president of the Lower House and president of the Upper House.

References

1910 births
1988 deaths
People from Santiago
Chilean Roman Catholics
Conservative Party (Chile) politicians
National Falange politicians 
Christian Democratic Party (Chile) politicians
Government ministers of Chile
Deputies of the XLII Legislative Period of the National Congress of Chile
Deputies of the XLIII Legislative Period of the National Congress of Chile
Senators of the XLVI Legislative Period of the National Congress of Chile
20th-century Chilean engineers
University of Chile alumni
Presidents of the University of Chile Student Federation